Emerson Rodrigues Ávila (born 16 July 1967) is a Brazilian professional football coach. He is the current assistant coach of Goiás.

Career
Emerson Ávila had worked for Cruzeiro for 10 years and since 2005 he had been an assistant coach for Cruzeiro. In the 2007 Campeonato Mineiro he was Cruzeiro's head coach for one game, the second leg match of the finals, because Cruzeiro's then coach Paulo Autuori had resigned after the first leg game. Still in 2007, Émerson Ávila became the head coach for Ipatinga and led them to an unpredictable promotion to Brazilian National First Division, but after a poor start to the Campeonato Mineiro 2008 he was fired. On 2 September 2011, he was named head coach of Cruzeiro, but his contract was terminated after six league matches. Cruzeiro were winless since he has been coached.
On 29 September 2011 Cruzeiro fired Emerson Avila as coach after 22 days in charge on Monday and named Vagner Mancini as his replacement.

Personal life
Émerson Ávila is married to Marluci and has two children.

Honours
Club
2008 Campeonato Paulista do Interior
National team
2011 South American U-17 Football Championship

References

External links
 
 
 
 

1967 births
Living people
Sportspeople from Belo Horizonte
Brazilian football managers
Campeonato Brasileiro Série A managers
Campeonato Brasileiro Série B managers
Cruzeiro Esporte Clube managers
Ipatinga Futebol Clube managers
Grêmio Barueri Futebol managers
Boavista Sport Club managers
Clube Esportivo Bento Gonçalves managers
Villa Nova Atlético Clube managers
Brazil national under-17 football team managers
Brazil national under-20 football team managers
Pouso Alegre Futebol Clube managers